Rubbermaid is an American manufacturer and distributor of household items. It is a subsidiary of Newell Brands. It is best known for producing food storage containers and trash cans. Additionally, it produces sheds, step stools, closets and shelving, laundry baskets, bins, air fresheners and other household items.

History

Rubbermaid was founded in 1920 in Wooster, Ohio as the Wooster Rubber Company by nine businessmen. Originally, Wooster Rubber Company manufactured toy balloons.

In 1933, James R. Caldwell and his wife received a patent for their blue rubber dustpan. They called their line of rubber kitchen products Rubbermaid.

In 1934 Horatio Ebert saw Rubbermaid products at a New England department store, and believed such products could help his struggling Wooster Rubber. He engineered a merger of the two enterprises in July 1934. Still named the Wooster Company, the new group began to produce rubber household products under the Rubbermaid brand name.

In 1984, Rubbermaid acquired Little Tikes, a toy maker. In 1985, Rubbermaid acquired competitor Gott Corporation. In 1996, Rubbermaid acquired Graco baby products.

In 1999, Rubbermaid was purchased by Newell for $6 billion. Then Newell changed its name to Newell Rubbermaid. Newell Rubbermaid changed its name again to the present-day Newell Brands in 2016 as part of a takeover of Jarden in another merger.

In 2003, the company announced its move out of Wooster to Atlanta, Georgia; 850 manufacturing and warehouse jobs would be eliminated, and 409 office jobs would move to other locations. A Rubbermaid distribution center remained at the former headquarters for some time, until it was recently purchased by GOJO Industries, Inc.

On November 16, 2004, Rubbermaid was used as a prime example in the PBS Frontline documentary "Is Walmart Good for America?"

Timeline
1920 Wooster Rubber is launched.
1927 Horatio Ebert and Errett Grable took over managing the company from the original 9 founders.
1933 Rubbermaid is launched.
1933 First Rubbermaid dustpan is introduced.
1934 Wooster Rubber and Rubbermaid merge to form Wooster Rubber Company and sell Rubbermaid products.
1942 WW2 eliminated Rubbermaid's housewares business, but the company was able to convert to military manufacturing.
1947 Rubbermaid introduces a line of rubber automotive accessories.
1955 Wooster Rubber Co. offer first public offering.
1956 Rubbermaid ventures into plastic products.
1957 Wooster Rubber Company changes name to Rubbermaid.
1965 Purchases German company Dupol.
1976 1,100 members of the United Rubber Workers union call a strike.
1981 Purchases Con-Tact plastic coverings.
1984 Acquires the Little Tikes Company.
1999 Newell acquires Rubbermaid for $6 billion and changes corporate name to Newell Rubbermaid.
2003 Rubbermaid headquarters move from Wooster, Ohio to Atlanta, GA.
2016 Newell Rubbermaid becomes Newell Brands as part of a takeover of Jarden in a merger.
2017 Newell sells the Rubbermaid totes line to United Solutions.

Former Rubbermaid CEOs
1933–1959 James Caldwell
1959–1980 Donald Noble
1980–1991 Stanley C. Gault
1991–1992 Walter W. Williams
1993–1999 Wolfgang Schmitt

Companies acquired by Rubbermaid
Prior to Rubbermaid merging with Newell Company.

1965 Dupol - German
1981 Carlan
1984 Little Tikes - Sold to MGA Entertainment in 2006.
1985 Gott Corporation
1986 MicroComputer Accessories
1986 Seco Industries
1987 Viking Brush - Canadian
1990 Eldon Industries
1992 Iron Mountain Forge Corporation
1994 Carex Health Care Products
1995 Injectaplastic S.A - French
1996 Graco (baby products)
1997 Curver - Europe - Sold in 2005.

See also
 Lock & Lock
 Newell Brands
 Tupperware

References

Newell Brands
Manufacturing companies based in North Carolina
Manufacturing companies established in 1920
Kitchenware brands
Food storage
Containers
1920 establishments in Ohio
1999 mergers and acquisitions
American companies established in 1920